The Russian Junior Figure Skating Championships are organized annually by the Figure Skating Federation of Russia to determine the country's junior-level national champions. The competition is held generally at the end of January or the beginning of February. Medals are awarded in four disciplines: men's singles, ladies' singles, pair skating, and ice dancing. The results are among the qualifying criteria for the World Junior Figure Skating Championships.

Medalists

Men

Women

Pairs

Ice dancing

See also
 Russian Figure Skating Championships

References

External links
 List of figure skating competitions on the website of the Figure Skating Federation of Russia

Figure skating in Russia
Figure skating competitions
Youth sport in Russia
Russian Figure Skating Championships
1994 establishments in Russia
Recurring sporting events established in 1994
National championships in Russia
Figure skating national championships